Pat, Patrecia or Patricia Scott may refer to:

Patricia Scott (author) (1926–2012), Australian author and storyteller
Pat Scott (1929–2016), American baseball pitcher
Patrecia Scott (1940–1977), Canadian-American actress and model
Patricia Scott (public servant), Australian government official and policymaker since 1990
Patricia Katherine Montagu Douglas Scott (1910–2012), Scottish countess
Patricia Scott (politician) (died 2001), member of the Washington House of Representatives

See also 
Pat Schroeder (born Scott, 1940–2023), American politician